Juglans mandshurica, also known as Monkey nuts, or Tigernut, is a deciduous tree of the genus Juglans (section Cardiocaryon), native to the Eastern Asiatic Region (China, Russian Far East, North Korea and South Korea).  It grows to about 25 m.

This species was first described by the Russian botanist Carl Johann Maximowicz, in Bulletin de la Classe Physico-Mathématique de l'Académie Impériale des Sciences de Saint-Pétersbourg, which was published in 1856.

The leaves are alternate, 40–90 cm long, odd-pinnate, with 7–19 leaflets, 6–17 cm long and 2–7.5 cm broad (margin serrate or serrulate, apex acuminate). The male flowers are in drooping catkins 9–40 cm long, the wind-pollinated female flowers (April–May) are terminal, in spikes of 4 to 10, ripening in August–October into nuts, 3-7.5 × 3–5 cm, with densely glandular pubescent green husk and very thick shell.

The tree is exceptionally hardy (down to at least -45 °C), has a relatively short vegetation period compared to other walnuts, grows rapidly and is cultivated as an ornamental in colder temperate regions all over the Northern Hemisphere. (For example, it has been found to grow satisfactorily in Edmonton, Alberta, Canada.) The kernels of the nuts are edible, but small and difficult to extract. The timber is in use, but less valuable than that of English walnut or black walnut.

The Manchurian walnut contains and exudes much lesser quantities of allelopathic compounds (such as juglone) than other popular Juglans species and usually causes few significant allelopathic effects in cultivation.

Juglans cathayensis, characterized by tomentose leaflets, producing more flowers per spike and growing south of the Yellow River, was sometimes recognized as a species separate from J. mandshurica.

The Japanese walnut (オニグルミ) is listed by some authorities as Juglans mandshurica var. sachalinensis (syn. Juglans ailantifolia).

References

External links
Juglans mandshurica @ Flora of China

mandshurica
Flora of China
Trees of Korea
Flora of Russia
Trees of Russia
Trees of continental subarctic climate
Fruit trees
Taxa named by Karl Maximovich